The 2010 Telkom Charity Cup was a South African football (soccer) one-day tournament for Premier Soccer League clubs, which took place on 7 August. It was the 25th Charity Cup, and the 4th under the current name.  The tournament was held at Soccer City for the first time since it was closed to be rebuilt, 3 years ago. The 4 clubs involved were chosen by a public vote. The participating teams were Kaizer Chiefs, Mamelodi Sundowns, Orlando Pirates and AmaZulu. The tournament was won by Kaizer Chiefs, on penalties, over Orlando Pirates.

Vote totals
Sundowns 191 384
AmaZulu 124 372
Orlando Pirates 113 989
Kaizer Chiefs 113 086

Fixtures

Semi-finals

Final

References

http://www.sport24.co.za/Soccer/Chiefs-win-Charity-Cup-20100807

Telkom Charity Cup, 2010
Tel
Soccer cup competitions in South Africa